The Jod-Basedow effect (also Jod-Basedow syndrome and Jod-Basedow phenomenon)  is hyperthyroidism following administration of iodine or iodide, either as a dietary supplement, iodinated contrast medical imaging, or as a medication (mainly Amiodarone).

Pathophysiology
This phenomenon is thus iodine-induced hyperthyroidism, typically presenting in a patient with endemic goiter (due to iodine deficiency), who relocate to an iodine-abundant geographical area. Also, people who have Graves disease, toxic multinodular goiter, or various types of thyroid adenoma are also at risk of Jod-Basedow effect when receiving iodine, because the thyroid will then not respond to the negative feedback from increased thyroid hormones. The source of iodine may be from the diet, administration of the iodinated contrast for medical imaging, or amiodarone (an antiarrhythmic drug).

The hyperthyroidism usually develops over 2 to 12 weeks following iodine administration.

In some ways the Jod-Basedow phenomenon is the opposite of two physiological compensation mechanisms (Plummer effect and Wolff–Chaikoff effect, which refers to the short period of thyroid-hormone suppression which happens in normal persons and in persons with thyroid disease, when comparatively large quantities of iodine or iodide are ingested. However, (unlike the Plummer and Wolff-Chaikoff effect), the Jod-Basedow effect does not occur in persons with normal thyroid glands, as thyroid hormone synthesis and release in normal persons is controlled by pituitary TSH secretion (which does not allow hyperthyroidism when extra iodine is ingested).

Precautions in medical imaging
In iodinated contrast administration for medical imaging, monitoring is indicated in people with thyroid disease, such as toxic multinodular goiter, Graves' disease, or Hashimoto's thyroiditis. Otherwise, for the general population, routine screening with thyroid function tests is generally not feasible.

History and nomenclature
The Jod-Basedow effect is named for the German word for iodine, "Jod" (all nouns are capitalized in German, and  German cognates of English nouns with an initial letter "I" preceding a vowel are frequently spelled with initial "J", pronounced as "y" like in "young", thus "Jod" = "y-ode"), plus the name of Karl Adolph von Basedow, a German physician who first described the effect. The nomenclature "Jod-Basedow" was carried over intact from the German, rather than being translated, presumably on the erroneous assumption that "Jod" is a surname. Thus, a more informative nomenclature in English, and one that avoids the appearance of an eponym involving a nonexistent "Dr. Jod", would be "the Basedow iodine effect".

The Jod-Basedow phenomenon is differentiated from Basedow's disease, which is occasionally used as a synonym for Graves' disease.

References

Endocrinology